MBZ, mbz, or MbZ may refer to:

 mbz, the ISO 639-3 code for Amoltepec Mixtec
MBZ, the IATA code for Maués Airport in Maués, Brazil
Mebendazole, a medication used to treat parasitic worm infestations
 Mercedes-Benz, a division of automotive manufacturer Daimler AG
 Mohammed bin Zayed Al Nahyan, third president of the United Arab Emirates since 14 May 2022 and ruler of Abu Dhabi
Music Biennale Zagreb, an international music festival in Zagreb, Croatia
 *.mbz, the backup file format for the Moodle learning management system (LMS)